Catocala desdemona, the Desdemona underwing, is a moth of the family Erebidae. The species was first described by Henry Edwards in 1882. It is found in Utah and Arizona, ranging south into New Mexico and Texas, and onwards through Mexico up to Honduras.

It was formerly considered to be a subspecies of Catocala delilah.

The wingspan is 60–65 mm. Adults are on wing from May to June depending on the location. There is probably one generation per year.

The larvae feed on Quercus gambeli, Quercus macrocarpus and Salix.

References

External links
Oehlke, Bill "Catocala desdemona Henry Edwards, 1882". Catocala. Archived from the original February 12, 2015.

Moths described in 1882
desdemona
Moths of North America